These page shows the results of the IV Beach Volleyball World Championships, held from October 7 to October 12, 2003, in Rio de Janeiro, Brazil. It was the fourth official edition of this event, after ten unofficial championships (1987–1996) all held in Rio de Janeiro.

Men's competition

Final ranking

Women's competition

Final ranking

References
 Beach Volleyball Results

2003
W
B
B